Michael Wright (born 3 March 1966) is a Hong Kong freestyle swimmer. He competed at the 1988 Summer Olympics and the 1992 Summer Olympics.

References

External links
 

1966 births
Living people
Hong Kong male freestyle swimmers
Olympic swimmers of Hong Kong
Swimmers at the 1988 Summer Olympics
Swimmers at the 1992 Summer Olympics
Commonwealth Games competitors for Hong Kong
Swimmers at the 1990 Commonwealth Games
Swimmers at the 1994 Commonwealth Games
Place of birth missing (living people)
Swimmers at the 1990 Asian Games
Swimmers at the 1994 Asian Games
Asian Games competitors for Hong Kong